The following is a list of Huddersfield Town A.F.C. players who have played in a first team game for Huddersfield Town.

Full list of players

Current players
Correct as of 18 March 2023.

Former players

References

99 Years & Counting - Stats & Stories - Huddersfield Town History

Players
 
Huddersfield Town
Association football player non-biographical articles